David Christopher Hawtin (born 7 June 1943) was the fourth Bishop of Repton from 1999 to 2006; and from then on an  assistant bishop within the Diocese of Sheffield.

Early life and education
Hawtin was born on 7 June 1943. 
He was educated at Keble College, Oxford.

Ordained ministry
Hawtin was ordained in 1967. He began his career with curacies in North East England, including at St Peter's Church, Stockton-on-Tees. After this he was: Priest in charge of St Andrew's, Gateshead; Rector of Washington, Tyne and Wear; and finally, before his elevation to the episcopate, Archdeacon of Newark from 1992–1999. After 7 years as the suffragan bishop of the Diocese of Derby he retired to Sheffield in 2006.

References

1943 births
Alumni of Keble College, Oxford
Archdeacons of Newark
Bishops of Repton
21st-century Church of England bishops
Living people